Live at the Point may refer to:
 Live at the Point (1994 Christy Moore album)
 Live at the Point (2006 Christy Moore album)
 Live at the Point (Shawn Smith album)